Kamaris, known as Gyamrez until 1978, is a village in the Kotayk Province of Armenia.

See also 
Kotayk Province

References 

World Gazeteer: Armenia – World-Gazetteer.com

Populated places in Kotayk Province